Sherel Floranus (born 23 August 1998) is a Dutch professional footballer who plays as a right back for Süper Lig club Antalyaspor.

Career
Floranus is a youth exponent from Sparta Rotterdam. He made his team debut on 21 August 2015 against FC Eindhoven starting in the first eleven and was replaced after 81 minutes by Denzel Dumfries.

International career
Born in the Netherlands, Floranus is of Curaçaoan descent. He is a youth international for the Netherlands. In June 2021 He was called up to Curaçao's preliminary squad for the 2021 CONCACAF Gold Cup.

Honours

Club
Sparta Rotterdam
 Eerste Divisie: 2015–16

References

External links
 

1998 births
Living people
Footballers from Rotterdam
Association football fullbacks
Dutch footballers
Netherlands youth international footballers
Dutch people of Curaçao descent
Eredivisie players
Eerste Divisie players
Süper Lig players
Sparta Rotterdam players
SC Heerenveen players
Antalyaspor footballers
Dutch expatriate footballers
Expatriate footballers in Turkey
Dutch expatriate sportspeople in Turkey